Cyllopsis pertepida, known generally as the canyonland satyr or canyonland gemmed-satyr, is a species of brush-footed butterfly in the family Nymphalidae. It is found in North America.

The MONA or Hodges number for Cyllopsis pertepida is 4572.

Subspecies
These three subspecies belong to the species Cyllopsis pertepida:
 Cyllopsis pertepida avicula (Nabokov, 1942)
 Cyllopsis pertepida dorothea (Nabokov, 1942)
 Cyllopsis pertepida maniola (Nabokov, 1942)

References

Further reading

 

Satyrini
Articles created by Qbugbot
Butterflies described in 1912